Owen Beck may refer to:
 Owen Beck (boxer)
 Owen Beck (footballer)
 Owen Beck (ice hockey)